Colletotrichum nigrum is a fungal plant pathogen.

References

External links

nigrum
Fungal plant pathogens and diseases
Fungi described in 1890